The Museum of History of Communication Development on the River Don – a specialized museum dedicated to the history of the emergence and development of communication in the Rostov Region.

History 
The museum of the history of communication development on the Don was opened on May 6, 2009 in the Rostov branch of "Southern Telecommunications Company". The opening of the museum was timed to coincide with the 150th anniversary of the founder of the modern telecommunication industry Alexander Stepanovich Popov. The museum was created on the initiative of the head of the Rostov branch of "Southern Telecommunications Company" Yuri Metla.

The museum presents a variety of telephone equipment, which was used by the signalmen for 120 years. The first phones without dialing, the communication facilities of the First and Second World War, radio stations, etc. are presented. Among the exhibits there is an American field telephone of 1942, which was presented to the museum for the 60th anniversary of the Victory.

In the museum you can get acquainted with the history of communication development in the Rostov region, which dates back to April 1885. At this time, the City Duma decided to provide the city with telephone communication. The launch of the communication station took place on August 20, 1886. The capacity of the first station was 60 numbers, by 1913 the number of subscribers was 3304. Switching of subscribers was carried out by telephone operators. The telephone network was operated by K. Siegel.

In honor of the opening of telephone communications in the city in 2006, a bronze plaque was installed on the city administration building.

Over time, communication in the area developed, its capacity increased, and educational institutions were created to train specialists. In the years of the Great Patriotic War, more than 1,400 communications specialists were taken to the front. Immediately after the liberation of Rostov-on-Don in February 1943 a connection in the city earned. Over time, the city developed all types of communication, including telephone, telegraph, radio communication, space communications through artificial satellites of the earth.

Description 
In total, the museum has about 500 exhibits: from Siemens phone 1905 to modern mobile phones. On the stand photos of the museum you can see city telephone operators. In the first years of the development of communication, only tall girls could work phone callers. High girls with long arms could reach the telephone connectors manually using wires.

References 

Museums in Rostov Oblast